The Anderson Joes were a minor league baseball club that existed in 2007.  The team was based in Anderson, South Carolina and was named after outfielder Shoeless Joe Jackson, who grew up in the local area. The team played as a member of the independent South Coast League.

The Joes began the season with Desi Wilson, a former first baseman with the San Francisco Giants, serving as the team's manager. However, midway through the season, he left the position of manager and was activated as a player. He was then traded to the South Georgia Peanuts where he served as a player-coach for the remainder of the season. Wilson was replaced at the position by veteran minor league manager Kash Beauchamp. 

The team finished their lone season at 5th place in the league standings, 12 games in front of the last place Charlotte County Redfish.

2007 season

References

2007 establishments in South Carolina
Sports clubs disestablished in 2007
Defunct minor league baseball teams
Defunct independent baseball league teams
Anderson County, South Carolina
South Coast League teams
Defunct baseball teams in South Carolina
Baseball teams disestablished in 2007
Baseball teams established in 2007